Santos Dumont Airport  is the second major airport serving Rio de Janeiro, Brazil.  It is named after the Brazilian aviation pioneer Alberto Santos Dumont (1873–1932). It is operated by Infraero.

Santos Dumont has slot restrictions operating with a maximum of 19 operations/hour, being one of the five airports with such restrictions in Brazil.

History

Originally known as Calabouço Airport, the history of the airport can be traced back to the early 1930s.  Until that time, the few aircraft equipped with landing gear used Manguinhos Airport.  Seaplanes, which at the time operated the majority of domestic and international flights, used a terminal located at the Calabouço Point, an area known today as Praça Marechal Âncora. Take-off and landings were made using an area of Guanabara Bay then known as estirão do Caju (Caju water stretch). It was as a development of the terminal at Calabouço Point that Calabouço Airport was created.

The airport complex was inaugurated on 16 October 1936 and was named Santos Dumont Airport.

It was also in 1936 that the construction of a new passenger terminal began. It was a project led by the architects MMM Roberto (Marcelo, Milton and Mauricio Roberto Doria-Baptista) inspired in the Paris - Le Bourget Airport terminal. Its pioneering, modernist, architectural features created a Brazilian national landmark. It was only in 1947 that its construction was completed. This building continues to be used to the present day. In the lobby of this terminal, (now the arrivals terminal) two monumental paintings by Cadmo Fausto de Sousa can be seen. Named "Old Aviation" and "Modern Aviation", they feature many old and new means of flying. Both were unveiled in 1951.

A new public terminal building for seaplanes was inaugurated on 29 October 1938. It was a replacement for the original passenger terminal and was used by all airlines except Panair do Brasil and Pan American World Airways, which used their own facilities. Owing to the obsolescence of seaplanes, it ceased to be used in 1942. Today, this protected building houses the Historical and Cultural Institute of the Brazilian Air Force (INCAER).

Adjoining the original seaplane terminal, Pan American World Airways and its Brazilian subsidiary Panair do Brasil constructed their own dedicated terminal for seaplanes and aircraft with landing gear.  This terminal opened in 1937 featuring architecture inspired by the Pan American Seaplane Base and Terminal Building in Miami.  It included a passenger terminal, offices and hangars.  It remained the headquarters of Panair do Brasil until the airline was forced to cease its operations in 1965. It is now the headquarters of the Third Regional Air Command of the Brazilian Air Force.

On 21 May 1959 a formal agreement between Varig, Cruzeiro do Sul, and VASP created an air shuttle service, the first of its kind in the world. This service operated between Rio de Janeiro–Santos Dumont Airport and São Paulo–Congonhas and comprised regular hourly departures, common check-in counter, and simplified tickets and formalities. The service was an instant success. Transbrasil joined the partnership in 1968. Starting in 1975 the service was operated exclusively by Varig's Lockheed L-188 Electra propjets.  In 1999 this service came to an end because airlines decided to operate their own independent services.

With the gradual shift of international operations to Galeão Airport, opened in 1952, Rio de Janeiro–Santos Dumont lost its place as an international hub, but for many years retained its position of a major hub for domestic traffic, particularly until 1960, when the capital of Brazil was moved to Brasília.
The airport handles only part of Rio's short-to-medium haul domestic air traffic, and part of its general aviation and military operations.  The airport is famous for having some of the shortest runways on which some Boeing and Airbus aircraft can land.  An idea of these operations is given in the 007–James Bond film Moonraker of 1979, in which a Lockheed L-188 Electra briefly appears taking-off from the airport.

Due to a fire that almost destroyed the main terminal in 1999, the passenger terminal building was closed for 6 months.

On 26 May 2007, in time for the 2007 Pan American Games, a brand-new, modern extension of the original terminal was opened. This extension handles all departure operations, whilst the original terminal now handles all arrival operations. The new departures terminal increased the total capacity of the airport to 8.0 million passengers/year.

It was announced on 5 August 2009 that in order to renew its operational licence the Rio de Janeiro State Environment Institute (INEA) would require Santos Dumont Airport to adjust operational standards. After a meeting between INEA and Infraero held on 3 September 2009, the following compromise was reached: approach route 2 is used only when specific wind conditions that amount to 30% of total operations so require; the airport is closed between 23:00 and 06:00 hours: aircraft may depart or arrive until 22:30 hours, giving a half-hour tolerance period; and the maximum number of flights per hour was reduced from 23 to 19.

On 31 August 2009, Infraero unveiled a BRL152.2 million (US$80.2 million; EUR64.5 million) investment plan to upgrade Santos Dumont Airport, particularly the passenger arrivals terminal. The plan focused on the preparations for the 2014 FIFA World Cup, which was held in Brazil and Rio de Janeiro being one of the venue cities, and the 2016 Summer Olympics. The renovation was completed in 2013.

Whilst this airport is quite conveniently located very close to the city centre, the location is problematic because aircraft have Sugarloaf Mountain on the direct approach path, meaning that whilst installing an ILS system would be feasible because of the relatively clear approach path onto runways 20L/20R, it is not feasible as if an ILS was installed on runways 02L/02R, the glide path would head through Sugar Loaf. This means that aircraft have to negotiate the mountainous terrain beyond the two runways by either:a. flying over the bay entrance, then quickly swerving behind Sugar Loaf on to the runway glide path, orb. fly over central Rio and negotiate the mountainous terrain not just around Sugar Loaf, but also around the central west of Rio.

Airlines and destinations

Statistics

Accidents and incidents

Major accidents involving fatalities
3 December 1930: a Syndicato Condor seaplane Dornier Wal registration P-BACA crashed on Guanabara Bay while attempting to avoid a collision against another aircraft. Six passengers and four crew members died.
3 May 1934: a Syndicato Condor Junkers W-34 registration PP-CAR crashed during landing procedures at Rio de Janeiro–Santos Dumont. Two crew members died.
15 August 1938: a Syndicato Condor seaplane Junkers Ju 52 registration PP-CAT suffered an accident while departing from Guanabara Bay. All passengers and crew died, except for one crew member.
8 November 1940: a VASP Junkers Ju 52/3mg3e registration PP-SPF taking-off from Rio de Janeiro–Santos Dumont to São Paulo–Congonhas collided on mid-air with the de Havilland Dragonfly registration LV-KAB belonging to the Anglo Mexican Petroleum Company (Shell-Mex), which was preparing for a water-land in front of Fluminense Yacht Club, today Rio de Janeiro Yacht Club in Botafogo. Both aircraft crashed killing all 14 passengers and 4 crew on the VASP aircraft and the pilot of the Shell-Mex aircraft.
27 August 1943: a VASP Junkers Ju 52/3mg3e registration PP-SPD flying from São Paulo–Congonhas to Rio de Janeiro–Santos Dumont struck a building of the Naval Academy located close to the airport shortly after the second attempt to land at Rio under fog. The aircraft broke in two and one part fell in the water. Of the 21 passengers and crew, three survived.
12 September 1954: a Cruzeiro do Sul Douglas C-47A-70-DL registration PP-CDJ flying from Rio de Janeiro–Santos Dumont to São Paulo–Congonhas was forced to return to Rio de Janeiro due to technical problems and bad weather at São Paulo. On finals to Rio de Janeiro the aircraft came in too high. An overshoot was attempted but the aircraft descended and crashed into the Guanabara Bay. Six passengers out of 30 occupants died.
1 February 1958: a Lóide Aéreo Nacional Douglas DC-4 registration PP-LEM operating the night flight 730 to Fortaleza, during takeoff experienced a failure of engine no. 4. Takeoff was aborted and 100m before the end of the runway, a tire from the landing gear burst, causing the aircraft to run off the side of the runway and burst into flames. Of the 72 passengers and crew aboard, 5 died.
31 May 1958: a cargo Paraense Curtiss Commando registration PP-BTB crashed shortly after take-off of unknown causes. The crew of 4 died.
30 December 1958: a VASP Saab 90 Scandia registration PP-SQE flying from Rio de Janeiro–Santos Dumont to São Paulo–Congonhas experienced a failure of engine no.1 during climb-out after takeoff. The pilot initiated an emergency return to the airport, but during its second turn the aircraft stalled and crashed into Guanabara Bay. Of the 34 passengers and crew aboard, 20 died.
25 February 1960 (1960 Rio de Janeiro mid-air collision): a Real Transportes Aéreos Douglas DC-3 registration PP-AXD operating flight 751 from Campos dos Goytacazes to Rio de Janeiro–Santos Dumont collided in the air over Guanabara Bay close to the Sugarloaf Mountain with a United States Navy Douglas R6D-1 (DC-6A) registration 131582 flying from Buenos Aires–Ezeiza to Rio de Janeiro–Galeão Air Force Base. The probable causes of the accident are disputed, but include error of personnel and faulty equipment.  All 26 passengers and crew of the Brazilian aircraft died. Of the 38 occupants of the American aircraft, only three survived.
24 June 1960: a Real Transportes Aéreos Convair CV-340 registration PP-YRB flying from Belo Horizonte-Pampulha to Rio de Janeiro–Santos Dumont crashed into Guanabara Bay in the vicinity of Rio de Janeiro–Galeão due to unknown causes. All 54 passengers and crew died.
12 April 1972: a VASP NAMC YS-11A registration PP-SMI flying from São Paulo–Congonhas to Rio de Janeiro–Santos Dumont flew into the side of a mountain while on descent 50 km north of Rio de Janeiro due to pilot mistake. All 25 passengers and crew died.
23 October 1973: a VASP NAMC YS-11A registration PP-SMJ flying from Rio de Janeiro–Santos Dumont to Belo Horizonte-Pampulha aborted its takeoff, overran the runway, and slid into Guanabara Bay. Of the 65 passengers and crew, 8 passengers died.

Incidents
2 December 1959: a Panair do Brasil Lockheed L-049/149 Constellation registration PP-PCR operating as Flight 246 en route from Rio de Janeiro–Santos Dumont to Belém-Val de Cans with 44 passengers and crew aboard was seized and hijacked by officers of the Brazilian Air Force and forced to land at Aragarças, Goiás. Their intention was to use the aircraft in a bombing of Government buildings in Rio de Janeiro, and by thus starting a revolt against President Juscelino Kubitschek de Oliveira. The revolt faded after 36 hours, and the aircraft was commanded to fly to Buenos Aires where the hijackers requested asylum. There were no casualties.
31 October 1966: a VASP Vickers Viscount registration PP-SRM, was damaged beyond repair when it overran the runway.
8 December 1967: a Brazilian Air Force Vickers Viscount registration FAB2100 was written off when its undercarriage malfunctioned.

Access
The airport is located adjacent to downtown Rio de Janeiro.

Rio de Janeiro Light Rail has a station at the airport connecting the terminal with downtown area, the subway system, the Olympic Boulevard and the Central Bus Station.

See also
List of airports in Brazil

References

External links

Airports in Rio de Janeiro (city)
Airports in Rio de Janeiro (state)
Airports established in 1936
Transport in Rio de Janeiro (city)
Airfields of the United States Army Air Forces Air Transport Command in South America
Guanabara Bay
Things named after Alberto Santos-Dumont